Jannik Vestergaard (born 3 August 1992) is a Danish professional footballer who plays as a centre back for Premier League club Leicester City and the Denmark national team.

Vestergaard played for various Danish and German clubs before joining Southampton in 2018. He also played for various youth levels and debuted for the senior team in 2013.

Early and personal life
Vestergaard was born to a Danish father and a German mother in the Copenhagen suburb of Hvidovre and grew up in Copenhagen.

His German grandfather Hannes Schröers and uncle Jan Schröers were also footballers for Fortuna Düsseldorf and Bayer 05 Uerdingen respectively. His cousin Mika Schröers played for Borussia Mönchengladbach's youth teams in 2016.

He has a girlfriend, Pernille, and a dog, Brady.

Club career

Early career
Vestergaard played youth football with Vestia, Frem, Copenhagen and Brøndby. He began his senior career with German club TSG 1899 Hoffenheim. He moved to Werder Bremen in January 2015.

On 11 June 2016, Vestergaard joined Borussia Mönchengladbach for a reported transfer of €12 million plus bonuses.

Southampton 
Vestergaard moved to English club Southampton on 13 July 2018, signing a four-year contract. On 12 August 2018, he made his debut in a 0–0 draw against Burnley in the Premier League. He scored his first goal for the club on 31 August 2019, the equalizer in a 1–1 draw against Manchester United.

Leicester City
On 12 August 2021 it was announced that Southampton had accepted a transfer offer from Leicester City for Vestergaard. On 13 August 2021, he signed for Leicester City on a three-year contract, for an undisclosed fee.

Vestergaard was demoted to the Reserves in March 2023 after giving an interview critical of the management.

International career

Youth level
Besides Denmark, Vestergaard was also eligible to represent Germany through his German mother.

Vestergaard represented the Denmark national youth teams at under-18, under-19, under-20 and under-21 levels. He received his first call-up to the Denmark senior team in August 2013, describing it as his "dream" to play for the country, and he made his debut later that month in a match against Poland. His first goal for Denmark came in his first competitive game, against Sweden in the European Championship play-off return leg on 17 November 2015.

He represented the Denmark U21 team at the 2015 UEFA European Under-21 Championship in the Czech Republic, and scored in a 2–1 defeat of the host nation in the opening match at the Eden Arena in Prague.

Senior level
Vestergaard was a member of Denmark's squad at the 2018 FIFA World Cup in Russia, but did not make any appearances in the tournament.

In June 2021, he was included in the national team's bid for 2020 UEFA Euro, where the team reached the semi-finals.

Career statistics

Club

International

Scores and results list Denmark's goal tally first, score column indicates score after each Vestergaard goal.

References

External links
Profile at the Leicester City F.C. website
Player's profile at Danish Football Association

1992 births
Living people
People from Hvidovre Municipality
Danish men's footballers
Denmark youth international footballers
Denmark under-21 international footballers
Denmark international footballers
Association football defenders
Boldklubben Frem players
F.C. Copenhagen players
Brøndby IF players
TSG 1899 Hoffenheim II players
TSG 1899 Hoffenheim players
SV Werder Bremen players
Borussia Mönchengladbach players
Southampton F.C. players
Leicester City F.C. players
Bundesliga players
Regionalliga players
Premier League players
2018 FIFA World Cup players
UEFA Euro 2020 players
Danish expatriate men's footballers
Expatriate footballers in England
Expatriate footballers in Germany
Danish expatriate sportspeople in England
Danish expatriate sportspeople in Germany
Danish people of German descent
Sportspeople from the Capital Region of Denmark